The Ultimate Hits is the third compilation album by American country music artist Garth Brooks, released by Pearl Records on November 6, 2007.

The 3-disc set, composed of two compact discs comprising 34 songs, four of which were new: "More Than a Memory", "Midnight Sun", and "Workin' for a Livin'", a duet with Huey Lewis, which were all released as singles, plus the bonus track "Leave a Light On"; as well as a DVD containing 33 music videos.

The album was also released in a special pink edition on October 15, 2007, with proceeds going to Susan G. Komen for the Cure. The Ultimate Hits was later certified 10× Platinum by the RIAA.

Singles
The first single released from the album, "More Than a Memory", made US country chart history the week of September 15, 2007, when it debuted at No. 1, the first to do so. The other new singles were "Midnight Sun" (written by Brooks, Jerrod Niemann, and Richie Brown), and "Workin' for a Livin'", a duet with Huey Lewis, which peaked in the Top 20. The album's bonus track "Leave a Light On", written by Randy Goodrum and Tommy Sims, was the only new song not to be released as a single.

Commercial performance
The album debuted at number three on the U.S. Billboard 200 chart, selling about 352,000 copies in its first week. Selling 204,000 copies, the album went to number one on the Top Country Albums chart in its second week. In its third week, The Ultimate Hits sold 192,000 bringing its three-week total to more than 748,000 albums sold. In the United Kingdom the album was also a hit, reaching No. 1 in the country music charts and the top 10 on the pop charts.

On January 18, 2008, the RIAA certified The Ultimate Hits Gold, Platinum & 5 times; Multi-platinum - denoting shipments of 2.5 million in the United States. On June 26, 2014 the RIAA certified it 7 times Multi-platinum, and on September 21, 2016 10× Platinum for shipments of 5 million.  It has sold 3.1 million copies in the US as of November 2017.

Track listing

Charts

Weekly charts

Year-end charts

Certifications and sales

References

Albums produced by Allen Reynolds
Garth Brooks compilation albums
2007 compilation albums
Big Machine Records compilation albums
Canadian Country Music Association Top Selling Album albums